Rony Esar Feliks Beroperay (born 25 February 1992) is an Indonesian professional footballer who plays as a full-back for Liga 2 club Persipura Jayapura.

International goals
International under-23 goals

Personal life
In May 2016, Beroperay, along with teammates Yohanes Pahabol and Gerard Pangkali graduated from the Cenderawasih University in Jayapura with a degree in Physics. Beroperay is a Christian who gives credit to Jesus for his success.

Honours

Club
Persipura Jayapura
 Indonesia Soccer Championship A: 2016

International
Indonesia U-23
Southeast Asian Games  Silver medal: 2013

References

External links
Roni Esar Beroperay at Liga Indonesia

1992 births
Living people
Indonesian footballers
Liga 1 (Indonesia) players
Persiram Raja Ampat players
Persipura Jayapura players
PS Barito Putera players
People from Biak Numfor Regency
Indonesian Christians
Indonesia youth international footballers
Association football fullbacks
Association football wingers
Southeast Asian Games silver medalists for Indonesia
Southeast Asian Games medalists in football
Cenderawasih University alumni
Competitors at the 2013 Southeast Asian Games
Sportspeople from Papua
21st-century Indonesian people